The Welsh Seal is a seal used for Wales.

Independent Wales 
Seals were used by the native Princes of Wales during Welsh independence.

Llywelyn the Great 

On Llywelyn the Great' (Llywelyn ap Iorwerth) seal is dated to 1240. Llywelyn is pictured armoured in surcoat holding a sword in his right hand and a shield on his left arm mounted on horse galloping to the right.

Seals were used as a sign of authenticity of the signatory and a privy seal was sometimes added to the back of the wax seal to ensure further authenticity. Llywelyn ap Iorwerth is known to have used his privy or counter-seal such as in 1230, "sealing the letters with his secret seal because he has not his great seal with him".

Llywelyn the Last 
The privy seal of Llywelyn the Last (Llywelyn ap Gruffydd), his wife Eleanor and his brother Dafydd are thought to have been melted down by the English after finding them upon their bodies to make a chalice in 1284.

Archbishop Peckham, in his first letter to Robert Bishop of Bath and Wells dated 17 December 1282 stated "If the king wishes to have the copy [of the list] found in the breeches of Llywelyn, he can have it from Edmund Mortimer, who has custody of it and also of Llywelyn’s privy seal and certain other things found in the same place."

Owain Glyndwr 

Owain Glyndŵr's Great privy Seal as Prince of Wales included a dragon gules on his crest.

The Pennal letter, written by Owain Glyndwr is currently held in the Archives Nationales in Paris. Facsimile copies involving specialist ageing techniques and moulds of the famous Glyndwr seal were created by The National Library of Wales which were presented by the then heritage minister Alun Ffred Jones, to six Welsh institutions in 2009. The royal great seal from 1404 was given to Charles IV of France and contains images and Glyndŵr's title –  – 'Owain, by the grace of God, Prince of Wales'.

Glyndŵr's Great Seal and a letter handwritten by him to the French in 1406 are in the Bibliothèque nationale de France in Paris. Six reproductions were made by the National Library of Wales for display in Wales.

In 1999 an early day motion was put forward for the return of Glyndwr seals to Wales, but failed to reach sufficient support to be debated in parliament.

Wales in the United Kingdom
Provision for a Welsh seal is made in Part 4 of the Government of Wales Act 2006 which also designated the First Minister of Wales as "Keeper of the Welsh Seal" (Ceidwad y Sêl Gymreig). The seal is used by the First Minister to seal (and so bring into force) letters patent signed by the monarch giving royal assent to bills passed by the Senedd (Welsh Parliament) in order for those bills to become an Act of Senedd Cymru.

Welsh seal during the reign of Elizabeth II 

The basic form of the seal used during the reign of Elizabeth II was approved by the First Minister of Wales in January 2011. The seal is one-sided and represents both the monarch and the Welsh nation; it also features the Royal Badge of Wales. The final design of the seal was decided on 23 June 2011 by the Royal Mint Advisory Committee on the Design of Coins, Medals, Seals and Decorations, with the advice of the College of Arms. The design was made public in December 2011, following a visit by First Minister Carwyn Jones to the Royal Mint in Llantrisant, where the seal was about to be made. Queen Elizabeth II formally delivered the seal into the custody of the First Minister at a meeting of the Privy Council at Buckingham Palace, London, on 14 December 2011.

The design featured the following elements:
A representation of the monarch, Elizabeth II on a throne,
The Royal Badge of Wales,
The Welsh Dragon

Welsh seal during the reign of Charles III 
A new Welsh seal is expected to be struck following the accession of Charles III to the throne on 8 September 2022.

List of Keepers of the Welsh Seal
The Government of Wales Act 2006 designated the First Minister of Wales as Keeper of the Welsh Seal.

2011–2018: Carwyn Jones
2018–present: Mark Drakeford

See also

Wales 
Royal Badge of Wales
Welsh heraldry
List of rulers of Wales
Welsh Dragon
Gold dragon of Wales

Other 

Great Seal of the Realm
Great Seal of Scotland

References

National seals
British monarchy
Senedd